Alf Olsen (4 November 1925 – 24 February 2001) was a Norwegian gymnast. He competed in eight events at the 1952 Summer Olympics.

References

1925 births
2001 deaths
Norwegian male artistic gymnasts
Olympic gymnasts of Norway
Gymnasts at the 1952 Summer Olympics
Sportspeople from Stavanger